Compsotata is a genus of moths of the family Noctuidae. The genus was erected by Louis Beethoven Prout in 1907.

Species
Compsotata corneliae Behounek & Beck, 2012 Ethiopia
Compsotata elegantissima (Guenée, 1852) Zaire, Kenya, Mozambique, Zimbabwe, South Africa
Compsotata janmoullei (Kiriakoff, 1954) Zaire

References

Cuculliinae